Trevallyn may refer to:

 Trevallyn, Gauteng, South Africa
 Trevallyn, Tasmania, Australia